GNP Records was an American jazz record label.

Artists
Moms & Dads
Billy Strange
Savoy Brown
Stan Kenton
Bing Crosby
Neil Norman
David Matthews
Django Reinhardt
Duke Ellington
Louis Armstrong
Bob Kames
Champion Jack Dupree
John Lee Hooker
Memphis Slim
Clifton Chenier
Jimmy Reed
Big Joe Williams
Bukka White
Maurice Jarre
Rusty Warren
Big Bill Broonzy
Bobby Enriquez
Frank Morgan
Spud Murphy

References

American record labels
Jazz record labels